The Camaldolese Hermits of Mount Corona, commonly called Camaldolese is a monastic order of Pontifical Right for men founded by Saint Romuald. Their name is derived from the Holy Hermitage of Camaldoli, high in the mountains of central Italy, near the city of Arezzo. Its members add the nominal letters E.C.M.C. after their names to indicate their membership in the congregation. Apart from the Roman Catholic congregations, ecumenical Christian hermitages with a Camaldolese spirituality have arisen as well.

History

The Camaldolese were established through the efforts of the Italian monk Saint Romuald. His reform sought to renew and integrate the eremitical tradition of monastic life with that of the cenobium.

In his youth, Romuald became acquainted with the three major schools of Western monastic tradition. The monastery where he entered the Order, Sant' Apollinare in Classe, was a traditional Benedictine community under the influence of the Cluniac reforms. Romuald chose to be under a spiritual master, Marinus, who followed a much harsher ascetic and solitary lifestyle that was originally of Irish eremitical origins. Some years later, Marinus and Romuald settled near the Abbey of Saint Michael de Cuxa, where Abbot Guarinus was also beginning reforms but was building mainly upon the Iberian Christian tradition. Later, drawing on his various early experiences, Romuald was able to establish his own monastic pattern, though he himself never thought of it as a separate unit, seeing it as a full part of the Benedictine tradition.

Romauld moved around central Italy, founding several colonies of hermits (or "deserts"). Around 1012, he created his chief foundation, the Sacred Hermitage of Camaldoli in the Tuscan hills. Monks lived in individual cells, but also observed the common life, worshiping daily in the church and breaking bread in the dining hall. First appearing at Camaldoli were the order's distinctive white habit, and the combination of the two cenobite and hermit branches that afterwards became so marked a feature of the order.

Romuald and the early Camaldolese exercised considerable influence on the religious movements of their time. The emperors Otto III and Henry II esteemed him highly and sought his advice on religious questions.

In his old age Romuald started on a missionary expedition to Hungary with twenty-five of his monks, but he was unable to accomplish the journey, and he died in 1027.
The order was approved by Pope Alexander II in 1072.

There are Camaldolese hermitages and monasteries throughout Italy.

Organization

Current congregations

The Camaldolese form two separate congregations. Various attempts were made at reunion. None, however, lasted, the longest being in effect 1634–1667. In that final year, Pope Clement IX issued a Papal Bull establishing a definitive separation between them.

Benedictine Camaldolese
The Benedictine Camaldolese (OSBCam.) are headquartered at the frazione of Camaldoli in Tuscany. On the mountainside stands the 11th-century Holy Hermitage founded by St. Romuald. Its 16th-century monastery is located a few kilometers below.

The next community founded by the Camaldolese congregation was the Monastery of St. Mary of the Angels in Florence. By the 13th century, its scriptorium had become known throughout Europe as a major source of high quality parchments, which were much in demand. In this monastery the artist Lorenzo Monaco tentatively explored a vocation as a monk. Only the church of the monastery now remains in service.

Circa 1603 the Camaldolese Hermit Monastery, Kraków was established in the village of Bielany (now surrounded by Kraków). The priory consists of hermitages and the Assumption of Mary Church. Visitors are welcome for scheduled masses.

The New Camaldoli Hermitage on the coast road south of Big Sur, California, was founded in 1958 by the Holy Hermitage of Camadoli, Italy. Officially named the Immaculate Heart Hermitage, it stands on a mountainside overlooking the Pacific Ocean. New Camaldoli has founded two daughter communities, Incarnation Monastery in Berkeley, California, near the GTU, north of U.C. Berkeley in 1979 and the Monastery of the Risen Christ in San Luis Obispo, California in 2014.

The order maintains a mix of monasteries and hermitages for men in countries on five continents. Perhaps most prominent is Saccidananda Ashram founded in 1950 in the village of Tannirpalli in the Tiruchirapalli District of Tamil Nadu, India on the bank of the River Kavery.  Monasteries for women began in 1086; they are located now mostly in Italy and Poland, also in Tanzania and America. An oblate community was started in Australia which since the mid-1990s continues under New Camaldoli's Prior of Big Sur.

Camaldolese hermits
The other congregation, known as the Camaldolese Hermits of Monte Corona (Er.Cam.), was established by the Renaissance reformer Paolo Giustiniani. This group lives solely in hermitages, usually with a very small number of monks comprising the community. There are three houses in Italy, two in Poland, and one each in Spain, the United States, and Colombia, as well as a newer foundation in Venezuela. Unlike the other congregation, it is not a member of the larger Benedictine Confederation.
 Eremo Di San Girolamo (Monte Cucco), founded in 1521, does not have the separate, solitary cells typical of the other Coronese Hermitages.
 Eremo SS. Annunziata Di Monte Rua was founded in 1537. In the past, it was the center of various Coronese Hermitages in the Republic of Venice.
 Sacro Eremo Tuscolano was founded in 1607 at Frascati in the Alban Hills. It is the ordinary residence of the father major (superior general) and the novitiate house for Italy.
 Eremo Di Monte Argentino, the "Silver Mountain", was founded in 1609 in the outskirts of Cracow, Poland. It was visited by Pope John Paul II in August 2002.
 Eremo Cinque Martiri in Bieniszew in Poland was founded in 1663. In 1941 the hermitage was suppressed by the Nazis; three hermits died in concentration camps. It is presently the novitiate house for Poland.
 Yermo Camaldulense N.S. De Herrera, Burgos, Spain, was founded in 1925 on the site of an ancient Cistercian abbey. It is a novitiate house.
 Holy Family Hermitage in Bloomingdale, Ohio, was founded in the Diocese of Steubenville in 1959. Nine solitary cells stand, in original fashion, in a semicircle about the church. It is a novitiate house.
 Yermo Camaldulense de la Santa Cruz in Antioquia, Colombia, was founded in 1969. It is a novitiate house.
 Yermo Camaldulense Santa Maria de Los Angeles, Venezuela

The Camaldolese Crown (Italian: Corona) was designed by Bl. Michele Pina (1450–1522), and is sometimes called the Crown of Our Lord (Corona Del Signore). It was officially approved by papal brief on 18 February 1516.

Extinct congregations

An early Benedictine Camaldolese site was founded in Florence, St. Mary of the Angels.
 

Previously there were three autonomous congregations, based in Turin (founded 1596), Venice (1474–1569) and France (founded 1526). The monasteries attached to Hermitage of Turin seem to have been absorbed by the Monte Corona congregation in the 18th century. The Venetian congregation, which was headed by an abbot, and the French one were eventually suppressed by the Holy See. The French monks became associated with Jansenism, due to which their congregation was suppressed in 1770 and the monks dispersed.

By the early 20th century, the Venetian congregation, which was entirely coenobitic, was felt by Rome to be too few in numbers for continued existence, and its members were offered the opportunity to seek admission with the Congregation of Camaldoli. It had contributed many of its members to the service of the Church, most notably Pope Gregory XVI. The noted cartographer Fra Mauro had been a member of the mother monastery of St.Michael of Murano. It was in this community that the German merchant Daniel became a monk. Eventually, he established a solitary hermitage in the woods, where he spent long periods in prayer. He was murdered in his cell by robbers in 1413 and is today venerated as Saint Daniel of Murano.

In the Kingdom of Hungary, four Camaldolese monasteries were established: Zobor Hill (1695), Lánzsér (1701), Vöröskolostor (1710) and Majk (1733). In 1782 the Emperor Joseph II ordered the dissolution of every monastic order that, in his view, did not pursue useful activities.  Thus the Camaldolese monasteries in that realm were secularized.

Communities of nuns

Soon after the various communities established by St. Romuald began to develop, communities of nuns desired to share in this reform. Beginning under the guidance of Blessed Rudolph II, third Prior General of Camaldoli, they were accepted into the life of the Congregation. He founded the Monastery of San Pietro di Luco in Mugello near Florence to establish the model of their "Little Rule" in 1086.

At their zenith, only ten monasteries of nuns were a part of the Order. There were many small monasteries, however, which followed the Camaldolese Rule but were subject to local bishops. Of those who form a part of the Congregation of the Holy Hermitage, their Motherhouse is the Abbey of St. Anthony the Abbot in Rome, where the abbess lives.

The Camaldolese nuns ended up mostly in Italy and Poland in Złoczew. A few foundations, though, have been made in other countries. In France, a monastery of nuns was established by Polish nuns of the Order but it is on the verge of closure, with just one nun in residence. A monastery has been founded in Tanzania, which is currently flourishing.

Founded in 1979 by three Sisters, in Windsor, New York, Transfiguration Monastery became formally affiliated with the Camaldolese Benedictine Congregation in 1986. Sister Mary Donald Corcoran, O.S.B. Cam., has served as prioress since its foundation, which she made with two companions, Sisters Placid (a former recluse from France) and Jean Marie Pearse, a native of the region. For practical reasons, they have begun the process of changing their affiliation to an American Benedictine congregation, while still retaining Camaldolese traditions.

Modern era
The Benedictine Camaldolese order extended its presence to the United States in 1958 with the founding of Immaculate Heart Hermitage, more commonly called New Camaldoli Hermitage, in the Santa Lucia Mountains of Big Sur, California. New Camaldoli Hermitage later established a daughter house, Incarnation Monastery in Berkeley, California. Fr. Cyprian Consiglio is the current Prior at New Camadoli Hermitage of Big Sur.

The Camaldolese Hermits of Monte Corona established the Holy Family Hermitage in Bloomingdale, Ohio. For several years, there was also a small community, Epiphany Monastery, in New Boston, New Hampshire, which was closed in 1998.

There are Camaldolese communities in India, Brazil, and Tanzania, among others.

An ecumenical Christian community of Camaldolese hermits is present in various countries throughout the world and is known as the Community of Solitude (CoS). The Camaldolese Oblate Community of Australasia is another ecumenical community.

See also 
Christian monasticism
Červený Kláštor (monastery)

References

External links
 camaldoli.it – The Benedictine Camaldolese in Italy
 contemplation.com - The Benedictine Camaldolese in the United States
 camaldolese.org - The Camaldolese Hermits in the United States 
 Community of Solitude - Ecumenical Christian Camaldolese Hermits 
 Aerial photographs of the former Camaldolese Priory in Majk, Hungary

Camaldolese Order
Christian organizations established in the 10th century
Christian organizations established in the 11th century
Catholic organizations established in the 16th century
Roman Catholic monks
Catholic orders and societies
Hermits